The 1893 Albion football team was an American football team that represented Albion College in the 1893 college football season.

Schedule

References

Albion
Albion Britons football seasons
Albion football